East Georgia State College (EGSC) is a public college in Swainsboro, Georgia.  It is part of the University System of Georgia. As an access institution, the college serves a predominantly rural area of 24 counties in Georgia's coastal plain from its three campus locations.

History
In the 1960s, community leaders in Swainsboro and Emanuel County petitioned the state legislature to establish a community college in the area. In 1969, the Georgia Board of Regents underwent a study to determine the need for additional community colleges in the state. A year later, the Swainsboro–Emanuel County area was approved as a prospective site for a new college with the stipulation that the city and county provide land and funding to build the campus.

In September 1971, the citizens of Emanuel County approved a $2.1 million bond issue and provided  of land within the city limits of Swainsboro for a new college.  of the site was donated by the wife of then-U.S. Senator David Gambrell, Mrs. Luck Flanders Gambrell. In December of the same year, the Board of Regents granted final approval for Emanuel County Junior College. Then-Speaker of the Georgia House of Representatives and Emanuel County native George L. Smith II was instrumental in the college's establishment. In June 1972, temporary offices were set up in downtown Swainsboro and the college's faculty was hired while construction of the college campus began in December of the same year.

The college hosted its charter class of 167 students in the fall quarter of 1973 at a temporary site, as the campus would not be ready for another year. The college changed its name to East Georgia College in 1988 when the University System mandated that the term "Junior" be removed from the names of its two-year institutions and to give the college its regional identity. In the Board of Regents' June 2011 meeting, East Georgia College was granted approval to move to four-year status, allowing the college to offer limited bachelor's degree programs. With the change in its mission, the college was officially renamed East Georgia State College. The college admitted its first students into the Bachelor's program in Biology in fall 2012.

Campus

The college campus opened in 1974 with six buildings and has been expanded significantly since the turn of the 21st century. Opened in 2001, the Luck Flanders Gambrell Center houses the Learning Commons (college library, Academic Center for Excellence, and Common Grounds Coffee shop), main auditorium, classrooms, and administrative offices. In 2003, the Physical Education building was expanded with a new indoor gymnasium, fitness center, an art studio, and additional classrooms; it now home to the EGSC Bobcats. The Jean A. Morgan (JAM) Student Center was expanded and renovated in 2007, adding student meeting space and offices for admissions, financial aid, student records, business affairs and counseling and disabilities services. The JAM Center was expanded for a second time in 2020, adding student recreation space and a larger bookstore. In 2012, the college library was substantially renovated to accommodate the college's transition from two-year status to four-year status. The main campus also features an 18-hole disc golf course, 10k cross country course, outdoor tennis and basketball courts, a nature trail, Ezra Pond and Pa's Pond. In 2016, the campus was designated as a Bee Campus, and has applied for status as a Tree Campus. In 2017, the lower level of the Academic Building was expanded, adding additional biology laboratories and an 84-seat lecture hall.

The college opened a new southern entrance road, Madison Dixon Drive, named for one of the community leaders who pushed for the college's creation, at the intersection of Lambs Bridge Road and Meadowlake Parkway in early 2008, and the Sudie A. Fulford Community Learning Center was built near the new entrance in 2010. Named for a well known grade school teacher in the Swainsboro community, the center features an educational resource center for area K-12 students and teachers, meeting space for small conferences, educational outreach programs and summer camps, as well as a great room with a vaulted ceiling and fireplace and a full-dome planetarium. The center's construction was funded by a donation from Ada Lee Correll, Fulford's daughter and the wife of Georgia-Pacific CEO-emeritus A.D. "Pete" Correll.

In November 2009, the EGSC Foundation voted unanimously to appropriate  of land near the northern part of campus to construct the college's first on-campus residence hall. Bobcat Villas opened at the start of the 2011 fall semester and was expanded in the fall of 2016 through a USG P-3 initiative. The college's on-campus housing capacity is 412 students.

Athletics
In fall 2005, the student body selected a mascot, the bobcat, to represent the college in club sports and non-athletic functions. In fall 2008, students in a college-wide referendum approved a $75 increase in student fees to support a formal intercollegiate athletics program, with the Board of Regents approving the athletics fee in their April 2009 meeting.

The college is a member of the Georgia Collegiate Athletic Association (Region XVII of the National Junior College Athletic Association) and played an abbreviated schedule in all sports in the 2009–10 academic year with full varsity-level play starting the following year. The college's initial sport offerings include men's and women's basketball, women's softball, and men's baseball. In summer 2010, the college constructed an athletics complex behind the gymnasium, adding a baseball field, softball field, new tennis courts, and related support facilities.

In only its fourth season of competition, the men's basketball team clinched the college's first ever GCAA Championship and earned a bid into the 2013 NJCAA Men's Division I Basketball Tournament in Hutchinson, Kansas.

In Fall 2021, the college's four existing sports were augmented with junior varsity squads. In January 2022, the college athletics department announced that it would add men's and women's tennis and men's and women's cross country starting in Fall 2022.

Vision Series
The EGSC Vision Series is a community outreach initiative that brings programs of cultural and intellectual enrichment to East Georgia State College and the Swainsboro-Emanuel County area. Noteworthy speakers who have visited East Georgia State College include President and Mrs. Jimmy Carter, poet Maya Angelou, former Atlanta mayor and U.N. Ambassador Andrew Young, broadcast journalist Cokie Roberts, author and television commentator Bruce Feiler, former Chief Justice of the Georgia Supreme Court Leah Ward Sears, and former Georgia Governor, United States Secretary of Agriculture and incumbent Chancellor of the University System of Georgia Sonny Perdue. Vision Series lectures and concerts hosted at the college are free and open to the public.

The Vision Series also sponsors field trips to historical sites and locations of cultural interest, such as the Fox Theatre and the Georgia Aquarium. While students typically receive seating priority, the excursions are open to the public whenever space is available.

Satellite campuses
East Georgia State College operates two satellite campuses in Statesboro and Augusta as collaborations with Georgia Southern University (GS) and Augusta University (AU), respectively. The purpose of EGSC Statesboro and EGSC Augusta is to serve students living within the local area as well as those who do not meet the freshmen admission requirements of the hosting universities; those who are not eligible to attend EGSC may be referred to either Ogeechee Technical College or Augusta Technical College when appropriate. Students enrolled at either satellite campus pay EGSC's tuition rate and fees, which also include the host institution's student services fees, allowing EGSC students to access most of the student services provided to Georgia Southern and Augusta University students, such as library, dining, health, transportation, and recreation services. EGSC students are not permitted to seek membership at fraternities and sororities or participate in varsity intercollegiate athletic programs at their hosting institution; however, Statesboro and Augusta students are permitted to participate in EGSC's own athletic teams on the main Swainsboro campus. After completing a minimum of 30 credit hours of college level coursework, as well as attaining a minimum GPA of 2.0, students can choose to transfer to their hosting institution or another university-level institution, or remain at East Georgia State College to satisfy requirements for the Associate of Arts degree.

Statesboro
EGSC Statesboro (EGSC-S) was established in 1997. From its inception until July 2011, EGSC-S used leased office space to house its administrative functions and Georgia Southern classroom space for academic functions. In March 2010, the college broke ground on a new satellite center on U.S. Highway 301 South, near the main campus of Ogeechee Tech. The new campus opened just before the start of the 2011 fall semester and houses classroom space, a student computer lab, and a commons area in addition to its administrative functions. However, many student services and some classes are still hosted on the Georgia Southern campus.

In November 2018, The George-Anne, Georgia Southern's student newspaper, reported that EGSC officials plan to relocate the Statesboro Center to the Georgia Southern campus, citing student concerns regarding attending classes, utilizing student services, and participating in extracurricular activities on two discrete campuses. EGSC officials plan to use the Nessmith-Lane Center to house the Statesboro Center while Georgia Southern's continuing education division would relocate to the EGSC Statesboro Center facility. EGSC Statesboro Center's relocation to the Nessmith-Lane Center took place over the 2021 winter break, and opened for students in the 2022 spring semester.

Augusta
EGSC Augusta (EGSC-A) was established in 2013 to replace the "University College" program of the former Augusta State University following its consolidation with Georgia Health Sciences University to form Augusta University. ESGC-A is located on AU's Summerville campus, with Payne Hall housing administrative functions, while classes are held in Galloway Hall. Students residing in Aiken County and Edgefield County, South Carolina are eligible for an out-of-state tuition waiver.

Locations
East Georgia State College's official street address is listed as 131 College Circle.

EGSC Statesboro is located at 847 Plant Drive on the campus of Georgia Southern University.

EGSC Augusta is located at AU's Summerville campus, located at 2500 Walton Way in the city limits of Augusta.

By automobile, Swainsboro is approximately a 45-minute drive from Statesboro, an hour-and-a-half drive from either Macon, Savannah, or Augusta, and three hours from Atlanta.

References

External links
Official website
Official athletics website

University System of Georgia
Public universities and colleges in Georgia (U.S. state)
Education in Emanuel County, Georgia
Education in Bulloch County, Georgia
Educational institutions established in 1973
Universities and colleges accredited by the Southern Association of Colleges and Schools
Buildings and structures in Emanuel County, Georgia
Buildings and structures in Bulloch County, Georgia
1973 establishments in Georgia (U.S. state)
NJCAA athletics